The 2022 Niue National Awards were awards made under the Niue National Awards system to recognise achievement and service by Niueans. They were announced on 19 October 2022.

The recipients of honours are displayed here as they were styled before their new honour.

Niue Distinguished Service Cross (NDSC)
 Pokotoa Ikiua Lalotoa Sipeli

Niue Public Service Medal (NPSM)
 Fakahulahetoa Funaki
 Atapana Siakimotu

Niue Community Service Star (NCSS)
 Sergeant Albert Tasmania
 Launoa Gataua
 Robert (BJ) Rex
 Pitasoni Mahalo Tanaki

References

Niue National Awards
National Awards